The KPGA Gunsan CC Open is a professional golf tournament that takes place at Gunsan Country Club near Gunsan in South Korea. Prize money has been ₩500,000,000 since 2015.

In 2009 and 2010 Gunsan Country Club hosted an event sponsored by Dongbu Insurance.

Winners

Source:

References

Korean Tour events
Golf tournaments in South Korea
Recurring sporting events established in 2011
2011 establishments in South Korea